Spanioplanus is a monotypic genus of South American sheet weavers containing the single species, Spanioplanus mitis. It was first described by Alfred Frank Millidge in 1991, and has only been found in Peru and Venezuela.

See also
 List of Linyphiidae species (Q–Z)

References

Linyphiidae
Monotypic Araneomorphae genera
Spiders of South America